Pulse is the debut studio album by the American solo artist Thomas Giles — the pseudonym for vocalist and keyboardist Tommy Giles Rogers Jr. of the progressive metal band Between the Buried and Me. The album was released on February 1, 2011 through Metal Blade Records. Tommy Rogers previously released the album Giles under the name Giles in 2005 through Victory Records.

A music video for the opening track "Sleep Shake" was released on January 26, 2011.

Track listing

Personnel
 Thomas Giles - all instruments, production
 Jamie King - production

References

External links
Thomas Giles on Myspace

2011 debut albums
Metal Blade Records albums
Albums produced by Jamie King (record producer)